The 2019 Virginia House of Delegates election was held on Tuesday, November 5, 2019, concurrently with the elections for the Senate of Virginia, to elect members to the 161st Virginia General Assembly. All 100 seats in the Virginia House of Delegates were up for election. It resulted in Democrats gaining 6 seats in the House of Delegates, and gaining control of both chambers of the General Assembly, marking the first time that Democrats held control of both legislative and executive branches in Virginia since 1993.

Primary elections were held on June 11, 2019.

Background
In the 2017 Virginia House of Delegates election, Republicans held on to a slim majority of 51-49 after a drawing in a tied race went in their favor. In those elections Democrats gained 15 seats in what was widely considered a rebuke of the presidency of President Donald Trump.

Since the last elections several State House districts were redrawn, following a federal district court decision that struck down 11 districts for racial discrimination. The Republican majority in the House of Delegates appealed the decision directly to the United States Supreme Court. The Supreme Court affirmed the district court's decision in a 5–4 vote, arguing that the House of Delegates lacked standing in the case.

In the aftermath of the 2019 Virginia Beach shooting, Governor Ralph Northam called for a special session of the Virginia Legislature in order for it to consider different gun-control bills. The House of Delegates reconvened on July 9, 2019 only for it to adjourn again after 90 minutes of session. This decision was made on a party-line vote. Northam expressed his disappointment that no gun-control measures were considered. Then-Speaker of the House of Delegates Kirk Cox called the special session "just an election year stunt". He criticized the Democrats' focus on gun-control bills without considering mental health and penalization of crimes.

Results

Overview

Close races 
Seats where the margin of victory was under 10%:

Detailed results

Uncontested primaries are not reported by the Virginia Department of Elections.

District 1
Incumbent Republican Terry Kilgore has represented the 1st District since 2017.

General election

District 2
Incumbent Democrat Jennifer Carroll Foy has represented the 2nd district since 2018.

General election

District 3
Incumbent Republican Will Morefield has represented the 3rd district since 2010.

General election

District 4
Incumbent Republican Todd Pillion has represented the 4th district since 2014. He is retiring.

Republican primary election

General election

District 5
Incumbent Republican Israel O'Quinn has represented the 5th district since 2012.

Republican primary election

General election

District 6
Incumbent Republican  Jeff Campbell has represented the 6th district since 2014 special election.

General election

District 7
Incumbent Republican  Nick Rush has represented the 7th district since 2012.

General election

District 8
Incumbent Republican Joseph McNamara has represented the 8th district since the 2018 special election.

General election

District 9
Incumbent Republican Charles Poindexter has represented the 9th district since 2008.

General election

District 10
Incumbent Democrat Wendy Gooditis has represented the 10th district since 2016.

General election

District 11
Incumbent Democrat Sam Rasoul has represented the 11th district since 2014.

General election

District 12
Incumbent Democrat Chris Hurst has represented the 12th district since 2018.

General election

District 13
Incumbent Democrat Danica Roem has represented the 13th district since 2018.

General election

District 14
Incumbent Republican Danny Marshall has represented the 14th district since 2002.

General election

District 15
Incumbent Republican Todd Gilbert has represented the 15th district since 2006.

General election

District 16
Incumbent Republican Les Adams has represented the 16th district since 2014.

General election

District 17
Incumbent Republican Chris Head has represented the 17th district since 2012.

General election

District 18
Incumbent Republican Michael Webert has represented the 12th district since 2012.

Democratic primary election

General election

District 19
Incumbent Republican Terry Austin has represented the 19th district since 2014.

General election

District 20
Incumbent Republican Richard Bell has represented the 20th district since 2010. He did not seek reelection, and was succeeded by Republican John Avoli.

Republican primary election

General election

District 21
Incumbent Democrat Kelly Fowler has represented the 21st district since 2018.

General election

District 22
Incumbent Republican Kathy Byron has represented the 22nd district since 1998.

General election

District 23
Incumbent Republican T. Scott Garrett has represented the 23rd district since 2010. He did not seek reelection, and was succeeded by Republican Wendell Walker.

Republican primary election

General election

District 24
Incumbent Republican Ronnie R. Campbell has represented the 24th district since a 2019 special election.

General election

District 25
Incumbent Republican Steve Landes has represented the 25th district since 1996. He did not seek reelection.

General election

District 26
Incumbent Republican Tony Wilt has represented the 26th district since a 2010 special election.

Democratic primary election

General election

District 27
Incumbent Republican Roxann Robinson has represented the 27th district since a 2010 special election.

General election

District 28
Incumbent Republican Bob Thomas has represented the 28th district since 2018. He was defeated in the Republican Primary by Paul Milde, who was then defeated in the General election by Democrat Joshua G. Cole.

Republican primary election

General election

District 29
Incumbent Republican Chris Collins has represented the 29th district since 2016.

General election

District 30
Incumbent Republican Nick Freitas has represented the 30th district since 2016. He ran and won as a write in candidate.

General election

District 31
Incumbent Democrat Elizabeth Guzmán has represented the 31st district since 2018.

General election

District 32
Incumbent Democrat David A. Reid has represented the 32nd district since 2018.

General election

District 33
Incumbent  Republican Dave LaRock has represented the 33rd district since 2014.

General election

District 34
Incumbent Democrat Kathleen Murphy has represented the 34th district since the 2015 special election.

General election

District 35
Incumbent Democrat Mark Keam has represented the 35th district since 2010.

General election

District 36
Incumbent Democrat Kenneth R. Plum has represented the 36th district since 1982.

General election

District 37
Incumbent Democrat David Bulova has represented the 37th district since 2006.

General election

District 38
Incumbent Democrat Kaye Kory has represented the 38th district since 2010.

Democratic primary election

General election

District 39
Incumbent Democrat Vivian Watts has represented the 39th district since 1996.

General election

District 40
Incumbent Republican and Majority Caucus Chairman Tim Hugo has represented the 40th district since 2003. He was unseated by Democrat Dan Helmer.

General election

District 41
Incumbent Democrat and Minority Leader of the Virginia House of Delegates  Eileen Filler-Corn has represented the 41st district since 2010.

General election

District 42nd
Incumbent Democrat Kathy Tran has represented the 42nd district since 2018.

General election

District 43
Incumbent Democrat Mark Sickles has represented the 43rd district since 2004.

General election

District 44
Incumbent Democrat Paul Krizek has represented the 44th district since 2016.

General election

District 45
Incumbent Democrat Mark Levine has represented the 45th district since 2016.

General election

District 46
Incumbent Democrat and Minority Caucus Chair Charniele Herring has represented the 46th district since 2009.

General election

District 47
Incumbent Democrat Patrick Hope has represented the 47th district since 2010.

General election

District 48
Incumbent Democrat Rip Sullivan has represented the 48th district since 2014.

General election

District 49
Incumbent Democrat  and  House Minority Whip Alfonso H. Lopez has represented the 49th district since 2012.

Democratic primary election

General election

District 50
Incumbent Democrat Lee J. Carter has represented the 50th district since 2018.

Democratic primary election

General election

District 51
Incumbent Democrat Hala Ayala has represented the 51st district since 2018.

General election

District 52
Incumbent Democrat Luke Torian has represented the 52nd district since 2010.

Democratic primary election

General election

District 53
Incumbent Democrat Marcus Simon has represented the 53rd district since 2014.

General election

District 54
Incumbent  Republican Bobby Orrock has represented the 54th district since 1990.

General election

District 55

General election

District 56
Incumbent  Republican John McGuire has represented the 56th district since 2018.

General election

District 57
Incumbent  Democrat David Toscano has represented the 57th district since 2006. He did not seek reelection.

Democratic primary election

General election

District 58
Incumbent  Republican Rob Bell has represented the 58th district since 2002.

General election

District 59

General election

District 60

General election

District 61

General election

District 62

Democratic primary election

General election

District 63

General election

District 64

General election

District 65

General election

District 66

General election

District 67

General election

District 68

Republican primary election

General election

District 69

General election

District 70

General election

District 71

General election

District 72

General election

District 73

General election

District 74

General election

District 75

General election

District 76

General election

District 77

General election

District 78

General election

District 79

General election

District 80

General election

District 81

General election

District 82

General election

District 83

General election

District 84

General election

District 85

General election

District 86

General election

District 87

Democratic primary election

General election

District 88

Democratic primary election

General election

District 89

General election

District 90

General election

District 91

Democratic primary election

General election

District 92

General election

District 93

General election results

District 94

General election

District 95

General election

District 96

Republican primary election

Democratic primary election

General election

District 97

General election

District 98

General election

District 99

General election

District 100

General election

See also
2019 Virginia Senate election
2019 Virginia elections

References

2019 Virginia elections
Virginia House of Delegates elections
Virginia, House of Delegates
November 2019 events in the United States